The 3rd (Weser-Leine) Armoured Brigade was a brigade in the German Army that was disbanded in 1994. It was headquartered in Nienburg in north Germany. The Brigade's centre of gravity was in eastern Lower Saxony. Its last brigade commander was Colonel Friedrich-Johann von Krusenstiern.

Commanders 
Brigade commanders with rank on taking over:

External links 
Federal archive on the Brigade

Armoured brigades of the Bundeswehr
Military units and formations established in 1957
Military units and formations disestablished in 1993